Metius melancholicus is a species of ground beetle in the subfamily Pterostichinae. It was described by Straneo in 1952.

References

Metius (genus)
Beetles described in 1952